Mowbray may refer to:

People
 Mowbray (surname), including a list of people with the name
 House of Mowbray, an Anglo-Norman noble house
 Baron Mowbray, a title in the Peerage of England
 Mowbray Baronets a title in the Baronetage of the United Kingdom
 Mowbray Herald Extraordinary, an English officer of arms

Places

Australia
 Mowbray, Queensland
 Mowbray National Park, Queensland
 Mowbray Park and War Memorial, Brisbane, Queensland
 Mowbray House, Sydney
 Mowbray, Tasmania

United Kingdom
 Melton Mowbray, a town in Leicestershire, England
 Mowbray Park, Sunderland, Tyne and Wear, England
 Vale of Mowbray, an area of North Yorkshire, England

Elsewhere
 Mowbray, Cape Town, South Africa
Mowbray railway station
 Mowbray River, New Zealand

Other uses
 Mowbray College, a school in Victoria, Australia
 Mowbray Cricket Club, a cricket club in Mowbray, Tasmania, Australia

See also

 Moubray (disambiguation)
 Mowbraytown Presbyterian Church, Brisbane, Queensland
 Thomas v Mowbray, a 2007 High Court of Australia decision